Libero is the given name of:

 Libero Ajello (1916–2004), mycologist (see List of mycologists)
 Libero Andreotti (1875–1933), Italian sculptor, illustrator and ceramics artist
 Líbero Badaró (1798–1830), Italian Brazilian physician, botanist, journalist and politician who was assassinated
 Libero Grassi (1924–1991), Italian clothing manufacturer murdered by the Mafia
 Libero Liberati (1926–1962), Italian motorcycle racer
 Libero De Luca (1913–1997), Italian lyric tenor
 Líbero Parri (born 1982), Spanish footballer
 Libero Tresoldi (1921–2009), Italian Bishop of Crema